Pera is a genus of plants in the family Peraceae native to tropical America, from southern Mexico and the West Indies south as far as Paraguay. It first described as a genus in 1784.

Species

Species
moved to Chaetocarpus
P. echinocarpa - Chaetocarpus echinocarpus

References

External links 
 Peraceae in Stevens, P. F. (2001 onwards). Angiosperm Phylogeny Website. Version 7, May 2006.

Malpighiales genera
Peraceae